Cynthia Ettinger is an American actress, known for her stage and television work, most notably her appearances on the TV series Carnivàle and in the unaired pilot of the TV series Smallville.

Career
Ettinger was originally cast as Martha Kent for Smallville, but during filming everyone realized that she was not right for the role, including Ettinger.  She turned to theater jobs, and when the opportunity for Carnivàle came up, she chose that project because of the theater-like experience. Also appeared in the episode “The Parking Garage” in the popular TV series Seinfeld and in the 2000 movie Fail Safe by Stephen Frears.

References

External links
 
 Broadway World Interview

21st-century American women
American television actresses
Living people
Year of birth missing (living people)